Joseph Lawrence Scanlan (August 16, 1929 – December 18, 2020) was an American movie and television director who directed episodes of popular TV shows such as Lois & Clark: The New Adventures of Superman, What's Happening!!, Spenser: For Hire, Falcon Crest, Land of the Lost, and the NBC-TV soap operas Somerset and Another World in the early 1970s. He also directed four episodes of Star Trek: The Next Generation during its first and second seasons as well as an episode of Gene Roddenberry's Earth: Final Conflict.

Filmography
 Flatland
 Largo Winch (pilot)
 La Femme Nikita
 Strange World
 Race Against Fear: A Moment of Truth Movie (1998)
 Earth: Final Conflict
 Players (two episodes)
 Dead Man's Gun (1997, pilot)
 Stand Against Fear (1996)
 The Outer Limits
 Poltergeist: The Legacy
 Dangerous Minds (multiple episodes)
 Picture Perfect
 Lois & Clark: The New Adventures of Superman
 Spenser: A Savage Place (1995)
 Spenser: The Judas Goat (1994)
 Due South
 The Adventures of Brisco County, Jr. (three episodes)
 Kung Fu: The Legend Continues
 North of 60 (as Joseph Scanlan)
 I Still Dream of Jeannie (1991)
 Homefront
 The Hidden Room
 The World's Oldest Living Bridesmaid
 The Young Riders
 Island Son
 Quantum Leap
 Paradise
 War of the Worlds
 The Return of Ben Casey (1988)
 Nightstick (1987)
 Star Trek: The Next Generation
 Adderly
 Spenser: For Hire
 Spring Fever (1982)
 Falcon Crest
 The Starlost: Deception (1980)
 Knots Landing
 The Littlest Hobo
 Land of the Lost
 What's Happening!! (1 episode)
 Our Man Flint: Dead on Target (1976)
 The Starlost
 The Secret Storm (multiple episodes) (1972)
 Another World (1971)
 Somerset (1970–1973)

Awards and nominations
Scanlan was nominated for a Gemini Award for Best Direction in a Dramatic Program or Mini-Series (The Outer Limits) in 1995. He directed "The Big Goodbye" (Star Trek: The Next Generation), which won a Peabody award in 1987.

References

External links
 

2020 deaths
People from Brooklyn
American television directors
1929 births
Film directors from New York City